Trachycarpus takil, the Kumaon palm, is a fan palm tree that is endemic to the foothills of the Himalaya in southern Asia. It is very similar to Trachycarpus fortunei, the Windmill palm.

Distribution
The palm tree is native to the Kumaon division of Uttarakhand Province in northwestern India, and into adjacent western Nepal.

Description

However, leaf damage or total defoliation due to extreme temperatures is a possibility.

It is easily distinguishable from Trachycarpus fortunei from its infancy by: 
the young plants having the tendency to growing obliquely
the young trunk being distinctly conical
the adult trunk covered with very tightly clasping (not ruffled) chestnut brown fibers
the short, triangular, erect ligulas on the leaf sheaths of the terminal shoot
the leaves more spreading and those of the previous year being placed just below the last flowering spadices, reflexed, although still alive, by the leaf blade being irregularly divided only down to about the middle
the fruit being more distinctly uniform or considerably broader than high
the first leaves of sprouting T. takil seeds are duplicate (having only two ridges differing from T. fortunei with its quadruplicate first leaves.)

Taxonomy
Trachycarpus takil was first discovered by a Major Madden, a British Army colonel with a passion for botany stationed in the Himalayas during the 1840s. Unfortunately, while Madden produced precise descriptions of both the plant and location, he made the mistake of assuming it to be Trachycarpus martianus, failing to realize it was a separate species, thus losing the chance to claim its discovery. 

First officially described by the Italian botanist Odoardo Beccari in 1905 ("Le Palme del Genere Trachycarpus", in Webbia I). The leaves naturally shed themselves unlike Trachycarpus fortunei, leaving a semi bare trunk covered in fiber from the old leaf bases. Petioles about as long as the blade. Blade  orbicular,  in diameter, irregularly divided down to about the middle into 45–50 segments,  in length from the top of the petiole (hastula) to the apex of the median segments, the latter stiff and erect, not with drooping tips.

Cultivation
Trachycarpus takil is cultivated as an ornamental tree, including use as a cold hardy outdoor palm in colder climates than most palms could survive in.

Some plants in cultivation in the United States under the name Trachycarpus takil may be misnamed specimens of the dwarf form of Trachycarpus fortunei, also known as Trachycarpus wagnerianus.

See also
Hardy palms

References

takil
Flora of West Himalaya
Trees of Nepal
Uttarakhand
Garden plants of Asia
Ornamental trees
Taxa named by Odoardo Beccari